Stefania Zanussi (born 6 November 1965) is an Italian basketball player. She competed in the women's tournament at the 1996 Summer Olympics.

References

1965 births
Living people
Italian women's basketball players
Olympic basketball players of Italy
Basketball players at the 1996 Summer Olympics
Sportspeople from Friuli-Venezia Giulia
People from the Province of Udine